University City Blvd is a light rail station on the LYNX Blue Line in Charlotte, North Carolina, United States. It is located on North Tryon Street and Periwinkle Hill Avenue in University City. The station consists of a single island platform in the street's median, connected to an adjacent parking garage by a pedestrian overpass. The parking garage charges a flat weekday fee for all riders that do not have a one-day, weekly or monthly pass. Notable places nearby include the Belgate Shopping Center, IKEA and the Wells Fargo Customer Information Center (CIC). The station opened on March 16, 2018.

References

External links

 University City Blvd Station

Lynx Blue Line stations
Railway stations in the United States opened in 2018
2018 establishments in North Carolina